Methyl nitrite is an organic compound with the chemical formula . It is a gas, and is the simplest alkyl nitrite.

Structure 

At room temperature, methyl nitrite exists as a mixture of cis and trans conformers. The cis conformer is 3.13 kJ mol−1, more stable than the trans form, with an energy barrier to rotation of 45.3 kJ mol−1. The cis and trans structure have also been determined by microwave spectroscopy (see external links).

Synthesis 

Methyl nitrite can be prepared by the reaction of silver nitrite with iodomethane: Silver nitrite (AgNO2) exists in solution as the silver ion, Ag+ and the nitrite ion, NO2−.  One of the lone pairs on an oxygen from nitrite ion attacks the methyl group (—CH3), releasing the iodide ion into solution.  Unlike silver nitrite, silver iodide is highly insoluble in water and thus forms a solid.  Note that nitrogen is a better nucleophile than oxygen and most nitrites would react via an SN2-like mechanism and the major product would be nitromethane.  For example, sodium and potassium nitrite reacting with iodomethane would produce mostly nitromethane, with methyl nitrite as the minor product.  However, the presence of the silver ion in solution has a stabilizing effect on the formation of carbocation intermediates, increasing the percent yield of methyl nitrite.  In either case, some nitromethane and methyl nitrite are both formed.

The figure shows the two gas-phase structures of methyl nitrite, as determined by IR and microwave spectroscopy.

Methyl nitrite free of nitromethane can be made by reacting iodomethane with nitrogen dioxide:
2CH3I + 2NO2-> 2CH3ONO + I2

Properties and uses 

Methyl nitrite is an oxidizing agent and a heat-sensitive explosive; its sensitivity increases in presence of metal oxides. With inorganic bases it forms explosive salts. It forms explosive mixtures with air. It is used as a rocket propellant, a monopropellant. It explodes more violently than ethyl nitrite. Lower alkyl nitrites may decompose and burst the container even when stored under refrigeration.

Methyl nitrite is a toxic asphyxiating gas, a potent cyanotic agent. Exposure may result in methemoglobinemia.

Methyl nitrite is produced by the combustion of unleaded petrol, and it has been proposed as a possible cause of the decline of insects, and hence that of the house sparrow and other songbirds in Europe.

Methyl nitrite is also present in aged cigarette smoke. Here it is presumably formed from nitrous oxide (itself formed by autoxidation of nitric oxide) and methanol.

Methyl nitrite is used in chemical synthesis as a precursor and intermediate, e.g. during production of phenylpropanolamine.

See also 

 Nitromethane
 Organic chemistry
 Nucleophilic substitution

References

Cited sources

External links

WebBook page for CH3NO2
  Determination of cis and trans structures of methyl nitrite by microwave spectroscopy.

Antianginals
Antidotes
Methyl esters
Alkyl nitrites
Explosive gases
Explosive chemicals